John Baptist Yang Xiaoting (born April 9, 1964) was a Chinese Catholic priest and Bishop of the Roman Catholic Diocese of Yan'an since 2011.

Biography
Yang was born in Zhouzhi County, Shaanxi, on April 9, 1964. He was ordained a priest on August 28, 1991.

He accepted the episcopacy with the papal mandate on July 15, 2010. On March 25, 2011, after the death of his predecessor, he became bishop of the Yan'an.

In 2010, he was elected vice-chairman of the Bishops Conference of Catholic Church in China (BCCCC). In December 2016 he was elected vice-president of the Catholic Patriotic Association.

In October 2018, Yang attended Mass with Joseph Guo Jincai at St. Peter's Square in the Vatican City, after China and the Vatican signed an interim agreement on the appointment of bishops last month.

References

1957 births
People from Xi'an
Living people
21st-century Roman Catholic bishops in China
Bishops of the Catholic Patriotic Association